Goldrick is a surname. Notable people with the surname include:

Emma Goldrick, pseudonym used by Emma Elizabeth Jean Sutcliffe (1923–2008) and Robert N. Goldrick (1919–1996), American writers
James Goldrick (born 1958), Royal Australian Navy admiral

See also
Sara Goldrick-Rab, American academic
McGoldrick